White-Westinghouse is an American home appliance brand used under license by trademark owner Westinghouse Licensing Corporation. It was created in 1975 when White Consolidated Industries bought the Westinghouse Electric Corporation's major appliance business. White Consolidated Industries was in turn acquired by Electrolux in 1986.

Electrolux made White-Westinghouse branded appliances as recently as 2006.

History
Westinghouse entered the  major appliance industry by acquiring the "Copeman Electric Stove Company" in 1917. It later moved production from Flint, Michigan to Mansfield, Ohio. Copeman had begun manufacturing its first electric ranges in 1914. Electric ranges were first demonstrated by Thomas Ahearn in 1892, gained in popularity as electrification became widespread throughout the United States.

The company claims to have made several important innovations:
 1930s refrigerators with sealed refrigeration units
 1930s room air conditioners
 1930s portable dishwashers
 1939 automatic washing machine that was not bolted to the floor.
 1950s auto-defrost refrigerators.

The company manufactured both large and small appliances for many years. Appliances bearing the White-Westinghouse name were made by Electrolux after 1998 under license from Paramount Global through its Westinghouse brand management subsidiary.

In the mid-1990s, household products and electronics bearing the White-Westinghouse name were sold by Kmart stores in the United States. This essentially gave Kmart a private-label brand in the value category for household goods. This agreement was between Windmere-Durable Holdings, Salton/Maxim Housewares and New M-Tech Corp., who licensed the name from the then Westinghouse Electric. Most larger-sized TVs were relabeled models produced by Daewoo Electronics Corp. This partnership dissolved in the early 2000s and many of the products were discontinued or switched to Kmart's "Home Essentials" brand. Televisions continued to be produced by Daewoo, but were re-labeled as Curtis-Mathes, another brand licensed to Kmart for a brief period of time.

References

External links 
 

Home appliance manufacturers of the United States
Electrolux brands
Westinghouse Electric Company
White Consolidated Industries
1986 mergers and acquisitions
American companies established in 1975